Gideon Stargrave is a comics character created by Grant Morrison in 1978 for the anthology comic Near Myths, and later incorporated into their series The Invisibles. The character is based on J. G. Ballard's "The Day of Forever" and Michael Moorcock's Jerry Cornelius, which led to accusations of plagiarism from Moorcock.

History
The first published Stargrave story appeared in Near Myths #3 (December 1978), as part one of "Gideon Stargrave in The Vatican Conspiracy", written and drawn by Morrison. Parts two and three were included back to back at the start of Near Myths #4 (1979), and ended with a teaser panel for "Gideon Stargrave in The Entropy Concerto". Near Myths was cancelled after issue five, before any more Stargrave stories were published, but according to Morrison there were "dozens of unpublished comics and prose stories" which they "wrote obsessively when [he] was 17" which they subsequently found very embarrassing to read, calling it "pretty embarrassing stuff – the work of a seventeen-year-old who doesn't get out of the house".

Though unpublished, "Entropy Concerto" featured a second version of Stargrave, with a "Beatles '65 haircut and Swinging London vibe" which Morrison says "was much better, in that I can still read the stuff without cringing". In the early 1980s, Morrison and Tony O'Donnell went to London for a meeting with the publishers of Pssst! magazine, who said they wanted to publish Morrison's Gideon Stargrave stories as well as some of their other work. Morrison said "I'd done a new Gideon Stargrave story... it's my favourite one I've ever done in my life and it's never been seen anywhere." Like Near Myths though, Pssst! was cancelled before it was published, leading Morrison to "feel that [he] was some kind of albatross". Stargrave's next appearance was in "Gideon Stargrave in Famine", a two-page comic strip in Food for Thought (a British benefit comic to aid Ethiopian famine relief) in 1985.

The character next made an appearance in Morrison's The Invisibles (Vol. 1, #17–19, 1995) as an alter-ego of King Mob, one of that title's main characters, who in literary terms is reported to have been based on Stargrave. In this incarnation, Stargrave is used by King Mob to confuse his enemies during interrogation. Gideon is a '70s spy modelled after James Bond and Jason King who spends every scene he appears in seducing his partner, and is supposedly the main character of King Mob's works as an author. In these sequences, we see not only the actual Stargrave story (quoting their earlier unpublished Stargrave stories directly) but King Mob's cover identity (or probable real world identity) as Gideon Starorzewski, who produces his work under the pen name Kirk Morrison.

This ties the real creator (Grant Morrison) in with their various fictional creations (Gideon Stargrave and King Mob/Gideon Starorzewski/Kirk Morrison) and bringing together the various creations in a metafictional conceit. Much of the premise of The Invisibles involves the philosophy that language is a perfectly acceptable method of creation so the notion that Gideon Stargrave is a fictional character does not preclude him from being also a real person. Morrison has also said that they wrote "that Gideon Stargrave story which is kinda the last word on The Invisibles, where he just dissolves into the flashbulbs and that's Gideon's entry into the Supercontext, his death experience".

Stargrave appeared in Vertigo's Winter's Edge #1 (January 1998) in "And We're All Policemen" with piercings and a shaven head like King Mob, but wearing the trademark purple coat of his first incarnation from "Entropy in the U.K.". His fictional writer, Gideon Starorzewski, starred in its companion short story "I'm a Policeman" in Disco 2000 (1998). Winter's Edge #2 (January 1999) included "Dress to Kill" – cut out cardboard figures of Lord Fanny and King Mob, with alternative costumes, including the purple outfit for King Mob of "his teen fictional counterpart, GIDEON STARGRAVE, King of the Mods".

Inspiration
In interviews before the publication of Stargrave stories in The Invisibles, Morrison said the main influence on Gideon Stargrave was J. G. Ballard's "The Day of Forever":

The style gave rise to comparisons with William S. Burroughs:

Morrison, however, denied the influence of Burroughs, saying:

On the publication of Gideon Stargrave in The Invisibles, the letters section at the end of "Gideon Stargrave in Entropy in the U.K." in The Invisibles (Vol. 1 #17) included an explanation of the character by Morrison, which gave much more credit to Moorcock:

Despite Morrison's statement, Michael Moorcock was so outraged that he reportedly wrote a letter to Vertigo, to be printed in all their magazines, "publicly voicing his disgust". Although Moorcock has encouraged other authors to use Jerry Cornelius, in a way that borders on open source, he has posted a number of comments about a couple of authors who, he believes, have directly lifted the character. David Gemmell is one author, but Moorcock reserves most of his scorn for Morrison:

On June 12, 2003:

On March 14, 2003:

Other earlier statements include:

In response, Morrison said in a 1997 interview:

And in an interview two years later:

They also expanded on the influence from Moorcock on parts of the story in a more recent interview in 2008:

Mark Millar jokingly wrote that "Gideon Stargrave is Grant Morrison with a girlfriend, cool clothes and no stammer" in reply to a letter asking what Gideon Stargrave was when filling in for Morrison, who was ill at the time, by writing the letters column for The Invisibles (Vol. 1, #22).

Notes

External links

 King Mob, Gideon Starorzewski and Gideon Stargrave entry at Everything2, which looks at the links between the characters
 Discussion on the Cornelius/Stargrave links at Barbelith
 The Bomb annontations for The Invisibles volume 1 #17 in which Stargrave appears

DC Comics male characters
Fictional secret agents and spies
Characters created by Grant Morrison